Jeffrey Urgelles (born June 19, 1982 in Miami, Florida) is the former bullpen coordinator for the Miami Marlins.

Life
Urgelles graduated from Southwest Miami High School, and from Broward Community College with an AA in Liberal Arts, where he was 2nd-Team All-Conference. He transferred to Savannah State University and was a First-Team All-Conference selection. He was a firefighter-paramedic for Miami-Dade County, Florida.
He is married.

Playing career
Urgelles batted Right, and threw Right; his height is 6' 1"; his weight is 200 lb.
He was a 26th round selection of the Cincinnati Reds in 2003, and spent three seasons in the Reds system before ending his career in the Blue Jays' organization.
He had a .235 career average with eight home runs and 82 RBI in 192 games.
In his first professional season, he led the Gulf Coast League in doubles (20), and ranked third in extra-base hits (22). He posted a 5 for 5 game with five doubles, three runs scored and three RBIs on July 17, 2003 at the Gulf Coast League Twins.

References

External links

https://www.flickr.com/photos/12157732@N06/5723741194/
http://sabrpedia.org/wiki/Jeff_Urgelles_(993e)

Baseball catchers
Miami Marlins coaches
Gulf Coast Reds players
Billings Mustangs players
Dayton Dragons players
Sarasota Reds players
Lansing Lugnuts players
New Hampshire Fisher Cats players
Baseball players from Miami
Sports coaches from Miami
1982 births
Living people
Savannah State Tigers baseball players